Várzea may refer to:

Places

Brazil
 Várzea, Paraíba
 Várzea, Rio Grande do Norte
 Várzea da Roça, a municipality in Bahia
 Várzea do Poço, a municipality in Bahia
 Várzea Nova a municipality in Bahia
 Várzea Alegre a municipality in Ceará
 Várzea da Palma, a municipality in Minas Gerais
 Várzea Branca, a municipality in Piauí
 Várzea Paulista, a municipality in São Paulo
 Rio da Várzea, a river in the state of Rio Grande do Sul, tributary of the Uruguay River
 Várzea, a neighborhood of Recife, Pernambuco

Cape Verde
 Várzea, Praia

Portugal
 Várzea (Amarante), a parish of Portugal
 Várzea (Arouca), a parish of Portugal
 Várzea (Barcelos)
 Várzea (Felgueiras), a parish of Portugal
 Várzea (Santarém), a parish of Portugal
 Várzea (São Pedro do Sul), a parish of Portugal

Other uses
 Varzea (lizard), a genus of lizards
 Várzea forest, a type of seasonally flooded forest growing along rivers in the Amazon
 Estádio da Várzea, a stadium in Praia on the island of Santiago, Cape Verde

See also
Várzea Grande (disambiguation)